The 2009–10 ISU World Standings, are the World Standings published by the International Skating Union (ISU) during the 2009–10 season.

The 2009–10 ISU World Standings for single & pair skating and ice dance, are taking into account results of the 2007–08, 2008–09 and 2009–10 seasons.

World Standings for single & pair skating and ice dance

Season-end standings 
The remainder of this section is a complete list, by discipline, published by the ISU.

Men's singles (177 skaters)

Ladies' singles (211 skaters)

Pairs (93 couples)

Ice dance (132 couples)

See also 
 ISU World Standings and Season's World Ranking
 List of highest ranked figure skaters by nation
 List of ISU World Standings and Season's World Ranking statistics
 2009–10 figure skating season

References

External links 
 International Skating Union

ISU World Standings and Season's World Ranking
Standings and Ranking
Standings and Ranking